Marine Karapetyan (born 3 March 1991) is an Armenian footballer who plays as a forward for FC Alashkert and the Armenia women's national team.

See also
List of Armenia women's international footballers

References

External links
 

1991 births
Living people
Women's association football forwards
Armenian women's footballers
Armenia women's international footballers
FC Alashkert players
Armenian expatriate footballers
Armenian expatriate sportspeople in Russia
Expatriate women's footballers in Russia
Armenian expatriate sportspeople in Georgia (country)
Expatriate footballers in Georgia (country)